Shanlee Elizabeth Johnston (born 5 February 1990) is a field hockey player from Canada.

Personal life
Shanlee Johnston was born in London, Ontario, and grew up in Vancouver, British Columbia.

She has a younger brother, Gordon, who also plays field hockey for Canada.

Career

National team
Johnston debuted for the national team in 2012 during a test series against the United States. Later that year she competed in her first international tournament during Round 1 of the FIH World League.

She won her first medal with the team in 2013, taking home bronze at the Pan American Cup in Mendoza.

In 2018 Johnston was a member of the national team at the XXI Commonwealth Games in the Gold Coast.

Johnston has also medalled twice at the Pan American Games, winning bronze and silver at the 2015 and 2019 editions, respectively. She won her second Pan American Cup medal in 2022, taking home bronze in Santiago.

International goals

References

External links

1990 births
Living people
Canadian female field hockey players
Female field hockey defenders
Sportspeople from London, Ontario
20th-century Canadian women
21st-century Canadian women
Pan American Games medalists in field hockey
Pan American Games silver medalists for Canada
Pan American Games bronze medalists for Canada
Field hockey players at the 2015 Pan American Games
Field hockey players at the 2019 Pan American Games
Medalists at the 2015 Pan American Games
Medalists at the 2019 Pan American Games